The first cabinet of Odilon Barrot was the government of France from 20 December 1848 to 2 June 1849 under President of the Council Odilon Barrot.
It was formed after the election of Louis Napoleon as President on  20 December 1848, the day that he took his oath.
It replaced the cabinet of General Cavaignac.
After the May 1849 elections to the Legislative Assembly it was replaced by the second cabinet of Odilon Barrot.

Ministers

The ministers were:

Changes
 On 29 December 1848, Léon Faucher substituted Léon de Maleville as Interior Minister; Théobald de Lacrosse substituted Faucher as Public Works Minister; Louis Buffet substituted Jacques Alexandre Bixio as Agriculture Minister.

References

Sources

French governments
1848 establishments in France
1849 disestablishments in France
Cabinets established in 1848
Cabinets disestablished in 1849